Abby Taylor (born 1985) is a Tobagonian politician from the Progressive Democratic Patriots. She has been Presiding Officer of the Tobago House of Assembly since January 2022.

In the December 2021 Tobago House of Assembly election, she was the only candidate from her party not to win a seat in the Tobago House of Assembly.

References 

1985 births
Living people
21st-century Trinidad and Tobago women politicians
21st-century Trinidad and Tobago politicians
Women legislative speakers